Vasmaq or Vesmaq may refer to:
 Vasmaq, Hamadan
 Vasmaq, Tafresh, Markazi Province
 Vesmaq, Zarandieh, Markazi Province